The 1895 Carlisle Indians football team represented the Carlisle Indian Industrial School as an independent during the 1895 college football season. Led by Vance C. McCormick in his second and final season as head coach, the Indians compiled a record of 4–4.

Schedule

References

Carlisle
Carlisle Indians football seasons
Carlisle Indians football